This is the complete list of (physical) number-one singles sold in Finland in 1998 according to the Official Finnish Charts composed by Suomen Ääni- ja kuvatallennetuottajat ÄKT (since late August 2010, known as Musiikkituottajat – IFPI Finland).

Chart history

References

Number-one singles
Finland Singles
1998